This is a list of the number-one downloaded songs in Canada during the year 2012.

The Nielsen SoundScan-compiled chart is published on Music Canada's website every Wednesday.

Chart history

See also
List of number-one music downloads of 2010 (Canada)
List of number-one digital songs of 2011 (Canada)
List of number-one digital songs of 2013 (Canada)

References

External links
Current Hot Digital Canadian Songs

Digital 2012
Canada digital songs
2012 in Canadian music